Ari Qullu Phujru (Aymara ari pointed, sharp, qullu mountain, phujru hole or pit in the earth without water, not very deep, "pointed mountain hole", also spelled Ari Kkollu Phujro, Arikkollu Phujru) is a  mountain in the Cordillera Occidental in the Andes of Bolivia. It is situated in the Oruro Department, Sajama Province, Turco Municipality, Chachacomani Canton, south-east of the volcanic complex of Kimsa Chata.

References 

Mountains of Oruro Department